Campbell Mattinson (born 1968) is an Australian editor, writer and critic. He was born in the Melbourne suburb of Williamstown and has worked as a writer, editor and photographer for the past 30 years. He is the current editor of Halliday Magazine, was the founding editor of Australian Sommelier Magazine, has been the publisher of The Wine Front website since 2002 and is the former SUNDAY Magazine wine columnist in Sydney and Melbourne. In June 2021 his debut novel We Were Not Men was published by Fourth Estate.

Mattinson's biography of one of the pioneers of the Australian wine industry, Maurice O'Shea, titled "Wine Hunter" was described by wine writer James Halliday as "One of the most remarkable wine books to come my way" in his weekly column in the Weekend Australian newspaper. Australian wine critic Max Allen wrote that "this is the best book on wine to be published in Australia for many, many years" in The Australian Magazine.

His Big Red Wine Book was published by Hardie Grant Books in May 2008. Second and third editions were released in June 2009 and 2010.

In July 2020 his short film Dissatisfaction won the Best Regional Short Film category at the St Kilda Film Festival.

Mattinson is married to author Thalia Kalkipsakis

Books and media
 Wine Hunter: The Man Who Changed Australian Wine, (2006) 
 The Big Red Wine Book, (2008, Hardie Grant Books)
 The Big Red Wine Book, (2009/10, Hardie Grant Books)
 Thin Skins, (2011, Stirling US)
 The Wine Hunter: The Life Story of Australia's First Great Winemaker, (2015) 
We Were Not Men, (2021)

Awards
 2020 – Winner Best Regional Short Film St Kilda Film Festival
 2016 – Winner Chairman’s Award Louis Roederer International Wine Writers’ Awards
 2013 – Winner Best Features Writer Australian Wine Communicator Awards
 2006 – Winner NSW Wine Press Club "Wine Communicator Award"
 2005 – R/U NSW Wine Press Club "Wine Communicator Award"
 2004 – Winner NSW Wine Press Club "Wine Communicator Award"
 1996 – Winner Best Australian Sports Writing Award
 1995 – Winner Independent Monthly Young Writer of the Year

See also
Australian wine

References

External links
The Wine Front
Campbell Mattinson

Australian wine critics
Living people
1968 births
Wine critics